Chrysolepis  may refer to:
 Chrysolepis (fish), a fish genus in the order Osteolepidida
 Chrysolepis (plant), a plant genus in the family Fagaceae